Anandpur Kalu is a village in Jaitaran tehsil of Pali district in the Indian state of Rajasthan.

Geography
It has an average elevation of 307 metres (1007 feet).

Demographics
 India census, Anandpur Kalu had a population of 8,334. Males constitute 51% (4,276) of the population and females 49% (4,058). The mother tongues are Rajasthani and Hindi. Men wear mainly safa and women wear lahnga.

References

Villages in Pali district